Marcia Collazo Ibáñez (born 13 March 1959) is a Uruguayan lawyer, teacher, and writer. She is a recipient of the Bartolomé Hidalgo Revelation Award, Woman of the Year Award in the literary field, First Prize of the Museo de la Memoria and the Ministry of Education and Culture in the Nibia Sabalsagaray Contest, and Morosoli Silver Award in Narrative.

Biography
Marcia Collazo was born in Melo on 13 March 1959, the daughter of artist Vladimiro Collazo and writer Suleika Ibáñez. She conducted several postgraduate studies in both specialties. She teaches the courses of History and History of Ideas in America at the Instituto de Profesores Artigas. In the Faculty of Law she is a professor of Philosophy of Law. She has published numerous essays and academic articles in the areas of law, history, and philosophy, as well as several literary works.

Her work has been published in Argentina, France, Spain, and Cuba. In 2011 she received the Bartolomé Hidalgo Revelation Award and the Woman of the Year Award in the literary field. In 2015 she received the First Prize of the Museo de la Memoria and the Ministry of Education and Culture for her story "Tremendo pozo", in the Nibia Sabalsagaray Contest, and in the same year she won the  Silver Award in Narrative.

Works
 2004, A caballo de un signo (poetry), AEBU
 2010, Alguien mueve los ruidos (poetry), Estuario
 2011, Amores Cimarrones. Las mujeres de Artigas (novel), Banda Oriental
 2012, La tierra alucinada: Memorias de una china cuartelera  (novel), Banda Oriental
 2014, A bala, sable o desgracia (short stories), Banda Oriental
 2015, Seguirte el vuelo: amores y desamores de la historia uruguaya (essay), Banda Oriental

References

1959 births
20th-century Uruguayan lawyers
21st-century Uruguayan lawyers
21st-century novelists
21st-century Uruguayan poets
21st-century Uruguayan women writers
Living people
People from Melo, Uruguay
Uruguayan women lawyers
Uruguayan educators
Uruguayan novelists
Uruguayan women educators
Uruguayan women novelists
Uruguayan women poets
20th-century women lawyers
21st-century women lawyers
Premio Bartolomé Hidalgo